Thomas Hovenden (December 28, 1840 – August 14, 1895), was an Irish artist and teacher who spent much of his life in the United States. He painted realistic quiet family scenes, narrative subjects and often depicted African Americans.

Biography

Hovenden was born in Dunmanway, Co. Cork, Ireland. His parents died at the time of the Great Famine and he was placed in an orphanage at the age of six.  Apprenticed to a carver and gilder, he studied at the Cork School of Design.

In 1863, he immigrated to the United States.  He studied at the National Academy of Design in New York City. He moved to Baltimore in 1868 and then left for Paris in 1874.  He studied at the École des Beaux Arts under Cabanel, but spent most of his time with the American art colony  at Pont-Aven in Brittany led by Robert Wylie, where he painted many pictures of the peasantry.

Returning to America in 1880, he became a member of the Society of American Artists and an Associate member of the National Academy of Design (elected Academician in 1882).  He married Helen Corson in 1881, an artist he had met in Pont-Aven, and settled at her father's homestead in Plymouth Meeting, Pennsylvania, outside of Philadelphia.  She came from a family of abolitionists and her home was a stop on the Underground Railroad.  Their barn, later used as Hovenden's studio, was known as "Abolition Hall" due to its use for anti-slavery meetings.

He was commissioned by Mr. Robbins Battell to paint a historical picture of the abolitionist leader  John Brown.  He finished The Last Moments of John Brown (at least two copies exist, in the collection of the deYoung Museum in San Francisco and also the Metropolitan Museum in New York) in 1884.  Gift of Mr. and Mrs. Carl Stoeckel in 1897. Accession Number 97.5 Mrs. Stoeckel was Mr. Battell's daughter. His Breaking Home Ties, a picture of American farm life, was engraved with considerable popular success.

In 1886, he was appointed Professor of Painting and Drawing at the Pennsylvania Academy of the Fine Arts, replacing Thomas Eakins who was dismissed due to his use of nude models.  Among Hovenden's students were the sculptor Alexander Stirling Calder and the leader of the Ashcan School, Robert Henri. 
 
Hovenden was killed at the age of 54, along with a ten-year-old girl, by a railroad locomotive at a crossing near his home in Plymouth Meeting.  Newspaper accounts reported that his death was the result of a heroic effort to push the girl in front of the train, while a coroner's inquest determined his death was an accident.

A Pennsylvania state historical marker in Plymouth Meeting interprets Abolition Hall and Hovenden. Hovenden House, Barn and Abolition Hall was added to the National Register of Historic Places in 1971.  He is buried across the street in the cemetery of the Plymouth Friends Meetinghouse.

Selected works

Self-Portrait of the Artist in His Studio, 1875, Yale University Art Gallery
Image Seller, 1876, Metropolitan Museum of Art
News from the Conscript, 1877
Loyalist Peasant Soldier of La Vendée, 1877
A Breton Interior, 1793, 1878, Metropolitan Museum of Art
In Hoc Signo Vinces, 1880, Detroit Institute of Arts, Michigan
The Old Version, 1881, San Francisco Museum of Fine Art
Sunday Morning, 1881, San Francisco Museum of Fine Art
Chloe and Sam, 1882, Amon Carter Museum
 Death of Elaine, 1882, Westmoreland Museum of American Art, Pennsylvania
The Last Moments of John Brown, 1882–4, Metropolitan Museum of Art
Taking His Ease, 1885, San Francisco Museum of Fine Art
I Know'd It Was Ripe, 1885, Brooklyn Museum
Breaking Home Ties, 1890, Philadelphia Museum of Art
Bringing Home the Bride, 1893, University of St. Thomas, St. Paul, Minnesota
Jerusalem the Golden, 1894, Metropolitan Museum of Art

References

External links

 "Thomas Hovenden Killed," The Pittsburgh Press, 15 August 1895.
 
 www.abolitionhall.com

1840 births
1895 deaths
19th-century American painters
American male painters
Irish emigrants to the United States (before 1923)
19th-century Irish painters
Irish male painters
People from County Cork
National Academy of Design alumni
Pennsylvania Academy of the Fine Arts faculty
Pont-Aven painters
Painters from Pennsylvania
Underground Railroad people
19th-century American male artists
19th-century Irish male artists